Bicentenario Stadium may refer to:

Argentina 
 Estadio San Juan del Bicentenario, in Pocito Department.
 Bicentenario Ciudad de Catamarca Stadium, in Catamarca.

Bolivia 
 Bicentenario de Villa Tunari Stadium, in Villa Tunari.

Chile 
 Estadio Regional Bicentenario Calvo y Bascuñan, in Antofagasta.
 Estadio Bicentenario Municipal Nelson Oyarzún, in Chillán.
 Estadio Bicentenario Luis Valenzuela Hermosilla, in Copiapó.
 Estadio Bicentenario Francisco Sánchez Rumoroso, in Coquimbo.

 Estadio Bicentenario de La Florida, in Santiago.

 Estadio Bicentenario Germán Becker, in Temuco.

Mexico 
 Estadio del Bicentenario,  in Tepic.

Paraguay 
 Bicentenario Nacional Stadium, in Ypacaraí.

Venezuela 
 Bicentenario Stadium, in Caracas.